Compsodrillia gundlachi is a species of sea snail, a marine gastropod mollusk in the family Pseudomelatomidae, the turrids and allies.

Description
The length of the shell attains 50 mm.

(Original description) The solid, slender shell is pale brown or whitish. It contains ten whorls (the nepionic whorls lost) strongly appressed at the suture; anal fascicle close to the suture,. The whorls are smooth or faintly spirally striated, rather wide and excavated. The notch is wide, not very deep. The sculpture consists of about six strong, short, turgid ribs obsolete in front of the periphery and on the last half of the body whorl. These are crossed by from two to five spiral threads stronger on the summits of the ribs, especially the pair which first appear, and faint, finer, spiral striations between the ribs. The lines of growth are well marked. The aperture is elongate. The outer lip is moderately thickened. The inner lip and aperture are white. The siphonal canal is rather wide.

Distribution
This marine species occurs in the West Indies and Puerto Rico.

References

 Daccarett, E. Y. & Bossio, V. S. 2011. Colombian Seashells from the Caribbean Sea. L'Informatore Piceno. 384pp

External links
 

gundlachi
Taxa named by William Healey Dall
Taxa named by Charles Torrey Simpson
Gastropods described in 1901